Hank Parker is a well-known professional bass fisherman in the United States.

In 1979, and 1989, the native of Maiden, North Carolina won two Bassmaster Classic tournaments, the biggest event in his sport. He is one of only four anglers to win the event more than once. Additionally, he was the first angler to win the Grand Slam of competitive bass fishing which includes the Classic, B.A.S.S. Angler of the Year in 1983, and B.A.S.S. SuperBass Tournament in April 1985. Hank finished in the money in 76% of B.A.S.S. tournaments he fished.

Parker teamed up with Michael Runnels to create Hank Parker's Outdoor Magazine in 1984, and debuted on January 12, 1985 on The Nashville Network cable channel. Notable show guests have included Larry Bird, Bo Jackson, Tony Dungy, numerous members of the U.S. Armed Forces and many more. The program now airs on Outdoor Channel and Pursuit Channel; it has previously aired on Versus (formerly OLN/Outdoor Life Network), ESPN and TNN, The Nashville Network (now Spike TV). In 1983, Parker was named B.A.S.S. Angler of the Year. Parker also lent his name and likeness to a fishing video game titled Bassin's Black Bass with Hank Parker, released in 1994 for the Super NES, in which the player must earn their way onto the pro bass fishing tour in order, where they ultimately compete against Parker. Parker also tried to qualify in three NASCAR Busch Series races in 1994, but did not make any of them.

Parker lives in Union County, South Carolina, with his wife, Martha.  He has four sons: Hank Parker Jr. and Billy Parker, who have both driven in the NASCAR Busch Series, Ben Parker, who is fishing the 2015 Rayvoc FLW Series, Timothy Parker, who is a fighter on the MMA circuit, and a daughter named Lucy Parker who is a professional photographer. Additionally, Hank and Martha have 13 grandchildren.

Over the years, Hank has been honored by being inducted in the Bass Fishing Hall of Fame, the Legends of the Outdoors Hall of Fame and the International Game Fish Association Hall of Fame.

After 30 years of television Hank's track record of integrity is shown in that he still has partnerships with many of the companies he started with including Ranger Boats, Mercury Marine and more.

See also
 List of American fishers

References

External links
 

Living people
American fishers
American hunters
NASCAR team owners
Year of birth missing (living people)
American television personalities
Male television personalities
People from Maiden, North Carolina